Apalāla is a water-dwelling Nāga in Buddhist mythology. It is said that Apalāla lived near the Swat River, this area is currently located in Peshawar, Khyber-Pakhtunkhwa Province, Pakistan. He is known to be a Naga King.

Apalāla was converted to Buddhism by the Buddha; this is one of the most popular legends in Buddhist lore and art. The tale is often told to children of Buddhist parents for them to learn their happiness lies in the Buddhist faith.

In Buddhist texts

The story of Apalāla's conversion (Pali: Apalāladamana) does not seem to be found in the Pali Canon, although his name does appear with other beings that honor the Buddha.

The Samantapāsādikā mentions that this story was among those not included in the Three Councils. It is evidenced that it was known in Sri Lanka as it is mentioned among the scenes depicted in the relic-chamber of the Mahāthūpa. The Divyāvadāna also mentions that Apalāla's conversion took place shortly before the Buddha's death.

Notes

Dragons
Buddhist legendary creatures
Nāgas